The Country Wit is a 1676 comedy play by the English writer John Crowne, part of the tradition of Restoration Comedy. It was first staged at the Dorset Garden Theatre in London by the Duke's Company. The cast included Samuel Sandford as Sir Thomas Rash, Thomas Betterton as Ramble, James Nokes as Sir Mannerly Shallow, Henry Harris as Merry, Cave Underhill as Booby, Matthew Medbourne as Lord Drybone, Anthony Leigh as Rash, Mary Betterton as 
Lady Faddle, Mary Lee as Christina, Elizabeth Currer as Betty Frisque and Elinor Leigh as Isabella.

References

Bibliography
 Canfield, J. Douglas. Tricksters and Estates: On the Ideology of Restoration Comedy. University Press of Kentucky, 2014.
 Van Lennep, W. The London Stage, 1660-1800: Volume One, 1660-1700. Southern Illinois University Press, 1960.

1676 plays
West End plays
Restoration comedy
Plays by John Crowne